Nail You Down is a Blue Öyster Cult Bootleg recording of their show at Perkins Palace in Pasadena, California on 24 July 1983, and released in 1992. This record has better quality than most bootlegs, being sourced from the RKO radio broadcast "Captured Live". The same set was made available as a download to purchasers of the Columbia Albums Collection box set (2012). In January 2021, the set is available under the name Blue Oyster Cult: Live ’83 at Frontiers Records.

Track listing
 "Stairway to the Stars" - 4:29
 "Harvester of Eyes" - 3:38
 "Workshop of the Telescopes" - 03:30
 "Before the Kiss, a Redcap" - 6:30
 "Born to Rock" - 3:41
 "Hot Rails to Hell" - 4:58
 "Seven Screaming Diz-Busters" - 10:45
 "Cities on Flame with Rock and Roll" - 5:57
 "Burnin' for You" - 4:50
 "Joan Crawford" - 5:53
 "Born to Be Wild" - 7:04
 "(Don't Fear) the Reaper" - 6:30
 "Roadhouse Blues" - 10:39

Personnel
Eric Bloom - vocals, electric guitar
Donald (Buck Dharma) Roeser - electric guitar, vocals
Allen Lanier - electric guitar, electric piano
Joe Bouchard - electric bass
Rick Downey - drums, percussion

External links
 Reference at official band page
 Bootleg record page at Viva Les Bootlegs

Blue Öyster Cult live albums
1992 live albums